Winkles is a surname of English origin. 

People with this name include:
 Henry Winkles (1801–1860) was an English architectural illustrator, engraver and printer, who, together with Karl Ludwig Frommel founded the first studio for steel engraving in Germany. 
 Bobby Brooks Winkles (1930–2020) was an American baseball player and coach.

English-language surnames